Bigland is a surname, and may refer to:

Alfred Bigland (1855–1936), English industrialist and politician, MP from 1910 to 1922
Edward Bigland (c. 1620 – 1704), English lawyer and politician
John Bigland (1750–1832), English schoolmaster and later an historian
Ralph Bigland (1712–1784), English officer of arms, antiquarian and cheesemaker
Ralph Bigland (1757–1838), English officer of arms